General Roca may refer to a number of things and places named after Argentine military Julio Argentino Roca:

Places
Argentina
General Roca, Río Negro
General Roca Department, Río Negro
General Roca Department, Córdoba
Villa General Roca town in San Luis Province

Others
Ferrocarril General Roca Argentine railway line connecting Buenos Aires with Zapala.
Roca Cup defunct football (soccer) tournament play by Argentina and Brazil.